Armadilloniscus is a genus of woodlice in the family Detonidae. There are more than 30 described species in Armadilloniscus.

Species
These 36 species belong to the genus Armadilloniscus:

 Armadilloniscus aegaeus Schmalfuss, 1981
 Armadilloniscus aestuarii Verhoeff, 1930
 Armadilloniscus albus Nunomura, 1984
 Armadilloniscus amakusaensis Nunomura, 1984
 Armadilloniscus biltoni Taiti & Ferrara, 1989
 Armadilloniscus binodulus Lewis, 1992
 Armadilloniscus brevinaseus Nunomura, 1984
 Armadilloniscus bulgaricus Frankenberger, 1941
 Armadilloniscus candidus Budde-Lund, 1885
 Armadilloniscus caraibicus Paoletti & Stinner, 1989
 Armadilloniscus cecconii Dollfus, 1905
 Armadilloniscus conglobator Taiti & Ferrara, 1989
 Armadilloniscus coronacapitalis Menzies, 1950
 Armadilloniscus ellipticus (Harger, 1878)
 Armadilloniscus hawaiianus Taiti & Ferrara, 1989
 Armadilloniscus holmesi Arcangeli, 1933
 Armadilloniscus hoonsooi Kwon & Wang, 1996
 Armadilloniscus iliffei Taiti & Ferrara, 1989
 Armadilloniscus indicus Ferrara & Taiti, 1983
 Armadilloniscus japonicus Nunomura, 1984
 Armadilloniscus lamellatus Taiti & Ferrara, 1989
 Armadilloniscus lanyuensis Kwon & Wang, 1996
 Armadilloniscus letourneuxi Simon, 1885
 Armadilloniscus lindahli (H. Richardson, 1905)
 Armadilloniscus littoralis Budde-Lund, 1885
 Armadilloniscus malaccensis Taiti & Ferrara, 1989
 Armadilloniscus mekranensis Kazmi, 2004
 Armadilloniscus minutus Budde-Lund, 1879
 Armadilloniscus mirabilis Ferrara, 1974
 Armadilloniscus nasatus Budde-Lund, 1908
 Armadilloniscus ninae Schultz, 1984
 Armadilloniscus notojimensis (Nunomura, 1990)
 Armadilloniscus ornatocephalus Lewis, 1992
 Armadilloniscus quadricornis Vandel, 1970
 Armadilloniscus steptus Schotte & Heard, 1991
 Armadilloniscus tuberculatus (Holmes & Gay, 1909)

References

Isopoda
Articles created by Qbugbot